Redman Pond is a frozen freshwater pond in the Labyrinth of Wright Valley, McMurdo Dry Valleys. The pond is the smaller of the two ponds west of Hoffman Ledge in Healy Trough. It is just northwest of larger Rodriquez Pond. Named by Advisory Committee on Antarctic Names (US-ACAN) (2004) after Regina Redman, U.S. Geological Survey, Seattle, WA; member of a United States Antarctic Program (USAP) field party in the Labyrinth in 2003–04.
 

Lakes of Victoria Land
McMurdo Dry Valleys